An ayam (아얌) is a Korean traditional winter cap mostly worn by women in the Joseon period (1392 – 1910) for protection against the cold. It is also called aegeom which literally means "covering a forehead" in Korean. There is a historical record which mentions that officials in a low class called  (이서) wore ayam in the early Joseon period, so it was a unisex cap. However, it is not clear whether the shape at that time was identical to that of the later period. During the late Joseon period, an ayam was usually worn by female commoners. Especially in the western part of Korea, kisaeng (female Korean entertainers) commonly wore an ayam, and they were also worn as a simple formal headgear.

Composition
The upper 4–5 cm part of the mobu is finely quilted, the vertical line of the front shorter than the back's. On the bottom edge, the front part is more curved than the back. In addition, the vertical lines of the front and back are a little curvy, so that, when wearing an ayam, it fits well to one's head. The fabric for the inner is red cotton flannel.

The tassel attached to the upper center of both front and back is mostly red in color and the strings connected from both sides are all flat braids.

There are two types of  hung on the back of ayam. One is made with two sheets of fabric in a 9–10 cm width which are linked together lightly. The other is made of one sheet of fabric in an 18–20 cm width, with the center folded. The ayam worn for spring and autumn has the same shape as the one for winter, but it is made of a lighter silk.

Expression
The Korean expression " (아양떨다)" which means to flatter or to perform aegyo to look cute around the people, originated from the act of shaking the "ayam".

See also
Hanbok
Hwagwan
Jokduri
Jobawi
List of Korean clothing
Mob cap
Tubeteika

References

Korean headgear
Caps